Lucien Lamoureux (16 September 1888, Viplaix – 5 August 1970, Creuzier-le-Vieux) was a French politician. He belonged to the Radical Party. At various times in the 1930s, he was the French Minister of Colonies, Labour, Commerce, and Finance.

References

1888 births
1970 deaths
People from Allier
Politicians from Auvergne-Rhône-Alpes
Radical Party (France) politicians
French Ministers of the Colonies
French Ministers of Finance
French Ministers of Budget
Members of the 12th Chamber of Deputies of the French Third Republic
Members of the 13th Chamber of Deputies of the French Third Republic
Members of the 14th Chamber of Deputies of the French Third Republic
Members of the 15th Chamber of Deputies of the French Third Republic
Members of the 16th Chamber of Deputies of the French Third Republic